The BWF Grand Prix Gold and Grand Prix was a series of badminton tournaments sanctioned by Badminton World Federation (BWF) which was run from 2007 to 2017.

Features

Prize money
A Grand Prix Gold tournament offered minimum prize money of US$120,000, while a Grand Prix tournament offered minimum prize money of US$50,000. The formula of prize money distribution was identical to Super Series tournament.

World Ranking points

The BWF Grand Prix Gold and Grand Prix series offered third only to BWF tournaments (after BWF events and Super Series), according to World Ranking system.

Tournaments

References

 
Badminton tours and series
2007 establishments
2017 disestablishments
Defunct sports competitions